Bunyan Bugs are a series of artificial lures used in fly-fishing, designed to look like a wide variety of insects, including grasshoppers, stoneflies, Mayflies, horse flies, bumble bees, ants and caddisflies.

Origin
The Saga of the Bunyan Bug by Norman Means described the origins of the Bunyan Bug:

History
"Bunyan Bugs" were designed by fly-tier and split bamboo fly rod maker Paul Bunyan (aka Norman Means) circa 1927, and originated in Montana. The construction of the Bunyan Bug is unique and has no parallel among other Montana or western trout flies. Norman's grandson, Richard Rose has kept alive a legend that Bunyan Bugs have caught mammoth trout and bass on the western rivers of the Rocky Mountains. His Bunyan Bugs have now become very collectable. Gathering the right materials to construct a Bunyan Bug is difficult, as is having the knowledge and patience required to make them. The Bunyan Bug was never tied like conventional flies. Imitation versions of the Bunyan Bug that have been tied like conventional flies have no value or represent the history of this dry fly. Today Bunyan Bugs are very rare and collectible.

Design
FlyAnglersOnline notes "The first Bunyan Bugs appeared in about 1929, and were all hand painted. Later, production models were made with a decal (fine tissue) which was lacquered in place making the paper disappear, leaving just the image."

According to Montana Trout Flies by George Grant, the materials are:
 Hook: "Size 4, heavy-wire, shank length about 1 1/4, also made with size 2 hook."
 Cork Body: "Just about same length as hook shank. Generally round but slightly flattened on both sides and bottom."
 Color: "Stained or painted deep orange. Segmented markings can be applied with permanent ink pens both top and bottom. Use black or dark brown ink."
 Wings: "Hair from horse mane, blonde or light sandy, inserted into front end of body so that wings will lie flat and spent."
 Tying note: "Body with wings cemented in slit, should be slit (not very deep) lengthwise and placed on top of hook so that almost all of the cork body is on top."
 "A strong tying thread, attached to the hook shank prior to positioning the cork body, will now be wound firmly at segment marking to firmly seat the body on the shank."
 "Use of strong adhesives in seating both wings and body will assist in keeping all parts in proper position."
 "Tying thread should be fastened off ahead of the wings with a whip finish. Coat entire body with clear varnish."

Notes

External links
 Bunyan Bugs in Cowboy Trout: Western Fly Fishing as If It Matters

Dry fly patterns